Karen Lorre (née Witter; born December 13, 1961) is an American actress, model, and writer.

Early life
Lorre was born Karen Witter in Long Beach, California. 
Lorre was a pre-med psycho-physiology major at the University of California, Irvine.  She studied the biochemical origins of mental illness while there.  To raise money for tuition, she worked as a model and appeared in commercials.

Career

Modeling
Lorre was Playboy magazine's Playmate of the Month for its March 1982 issue, and her centerfold was photographed by Arny Freytag. Witter later appeared on the cover of the March 1983 issue with fellow Playmates Kimberly McArthur and Kelly Tough. She was also featured in the December 1991 issue.

Acting
Lorre soon made the transition to acting, working mostly on television  on series as diverse as Mickey Spillane's Mike Hammer (1984), the syndicated version of Sale of the Century (1985–86), Cheers (1988), The Vineyard (1989), The X-Files (1995),  Witter later appeared as Nemesis in Hercules: The Legendary Journeys, in the seventh episode "Pride Comes Before a Brawl" (1995). Sliders (1996), Sabrina the Teenage Witch (1998), NYPD Blue (2000), Dharma & Greg (2000),  and Malcolm in the Middle (2001).

Lorre was cast in the role of Tina Lord, previously played by Andrea Evans, on the ABC soap opera One Life to Live,
after "one of the most expansive [searches] in soap history", beating out over 300 other hopefuls for the role.
Connie Passalacqua of Soap Scoop praised her casting in the role, saying it "added an actress with considerable dimension to the soap opera scene".
She played the part until 1994.
She was nominated for a 1991 Soap Opera Digest Award for Outstanding Female Newcomer in Daytime.

Life Coaching
Lorre retired from acting, and became a life coach & a spiritual healer. She has written three books on spiritual healing.

Personal life
Lorre was married to television writer and producer Chuck Lorre in 2001, changing her name from Karen Witter to Karen Lorre.  They divorced in 2010, and she kept Lorre's last name.

Published works

References

Further reading

External links

1961 births
Living people
American soap opera actresses
American television actresses
Actresses from Long Beach, California
1980s Playboy Playmates
American health and wellness writers
21st-century American women